Department of Institutional Finance & Credit Control, Haryana is a Ministry and department of the Government of Haryana  in India.

Description
This department came into existence when Haryana was established as a new state within India after being separated from Punjab. The department obtains credit and monitors borrowing from banks and other credit institutions. The department has no field office. The Cabinet Minister Captain Abhimanyu Singh Sindhu is the minister responsible for this department from October 2014.

See also
 Government of Haryana

References

Institutional Finance and Credit Control
State government finances in India
Economy of Haryana